The International Philosophy Olympiad (IPO) is an annual philosophy competition for high school students from around the world, one of the International Science Olympiads. It is organized under the auspices of the International Federation of Philosophical Societies (FISP) and supported by UNESCO.

History
The International Philosophy Olympiad was founded through an initiative by Ivan Kolev from Sofia University in Bulgaria. The idea was to help replace the Marxist–Leninist subjects taught in schools throughout Eastern Europe between 1947 and 1990. The first Olympiad was held in 1993 in Smolyan, Bulgaria, with three participating countries: Bulgaria, Romania (led by Elena Florina Otet), and Turkey (led by Nuran Direk). The second edition of the Olympiad, in 1994 in Petrich, Bulgaria, two additional countries joined: Poland (led by Władysław Krajewski) and Germany (led by Gerd Gerhardt). Together with Hungary (led by Katalin Havas) these countries founded the IPO. The IPO received welcome by UNESCO. Since 2001 the International Philosophy Olympiads have been organized under the auspices of International Federation of Philosophical Societies (FISP) and with the recognition and support of UNESCO.

In 2009 the number of participating countries rose from under 30 to about 40. The IPO 2020 originally scheduled to be held in Lisbon had to be cancelled because of measures against the COVID-19 pandemic. An electronic IPO (e-IPO) is organized by Slovenia.

Regulations

Objectives
According to the regulations, the objectives of the IPO are the following:
 to promote philosophical education at the secondary school level and increase the interest of high school pupils in philosophy;
 to encourage the development of national, regional, and local contests in philosophy among pre-university students worldwide;
 to contribute to the development of critical, inquisitive and creative thinking;
 to promote philosophical reflection on science, art, and social life;
 to cultivate the capacity for ethical reflection on the problems of the modern world; and,
 by encouraging intellectual exchanges and securing opportunities for personal contacts between young people from different countries, to promote the culture of peace.

Administration
The IPO is run by the following bodies: the International Committee, consisting of the delegation leaders having already organized an IPO, the Steering Board, consisting of members from the FISP, UNESCO and the International Committee, the National Organizing Committee, and the International Jury, consisting of all delegation leaders and teachers.

Competition
Students competing in the Olympiad are given four hours to write a philosophical essay on one of four topics given. The topics are provided in the four official languages of the IPO – English, Spanish, French, and German – and the student must choose to write in a language other than his/her own; that is, a native French speaker would not be allowed to write in French.

There are five criteria of evaluation.

Evaluation proceeds in three stages:

National selection processes
According to the regulations, the selection of the candidates participating for a particular country are chosen through a selection process which should be organized or be under the auspices of a national philosophical organization member of the FISP. The  precise structure of the national competition varies from country to country.

Austria
Austria first took part in the IPO in 2005. Since then they have two stages. In the first stage, every bundesland (state) sends the best two or three participants of the Landeswettbewerb to the philosophical akademie. There the second stage takes place and in this Bundeswettbewerb the two best will be sent to the IPO. The first Austrian participant were part of the German delegation in 2004.

Czech Republic
The Czech Republic's philosophical competition for high school students was established by Tomáš Nejeschleba at the Department of Philosophy, Faculty of Arts, Palacký University in Olomouc in 2011. Since 2012, the competition, called Nebojme se myslet, consists of two stages. In the first stage, students write an essay on one of four topics in Czech. The criteria are the same as in the IPO: relevance to the topic, philosophical understanding of the topic, coherence, power of argumentation, originality. The twenty best essays are qualified for the second stage in which students write a short essay in one of the four official IPO languages. The two best students qualify for the IPO. Since 2014, Jan Čížek from Palacký University has been the main organizer of the Czech philosophical competition. He is also the leader of the Czech delegation at the IPO.

Estonia
In Estonia, the selection process, which was initiated by philosopher Leo Luks, consists of two stages. In the first stage, students write an essay at home in their mother tongue. This means that Russian for the country's Russian minority is also accepted. The national jury (5 members) chooses the 10 best essays for the next stage. In the second round (4 days long), finalists first spend two days together where they participate in different lectures and workshops. After that, the final competition begins, which consists of four different parts:

The two best students represent the country at the IPO.

Germany
In Germany, there are three stages:

Hungary
The IPO selection procedure in Hungary is closely related to and based on the National Students Competition in philosophy, which is embedded in a wide range of National high-school competitions organized under the auspices of the Ministry of Education. All the competitions (mathematics, etc.) are organized in 3 levels, over January - April. The competitions in philosophy involve 11th and mainly 12th grade students, altogether approx. 300 students nationwide.
The first, school-level round is based on testing knowledge in history of philosophy (thus emphasizing the relevance of the curricula and maturity criteria).
Students with sufficient score are eligible to enter the 2nd round. The second round is about writing an essay, students are free to select one topic out of four. The best papers are selected by a jury of Academics, which consists of Faculty staff members invited by the ME, who will invite the students to the finals, i.e. an oral examination. Hungarian is the only official language all through the national competition levels.
The IPO Selection invites the best 30 students after the 2nd round. Under the supervision of the Hungarian Philosophical Society, a new Jury are being invited who will propose the 4 quotations, and they should evaluate all the papers. Students will take part at the IPO selection where all the IPO rules and regulations are respected: essay-writing, bi-lingual dictionary, timing, evaluation criteria, languages, etc. Usually approx. 15 students take part at the IPO selection and the authors of best 2 papers are proposed to participate at the IPO.
Students receive assistance from their teachers to participate at the competitions, however the Philosophical Youth Camps and the „Philosophical tea-house” movement (inspired by IPO colleagues in Turkey) may also help students to gain and deepen their interest in philosophy.

India
The Olympiad is non-funded and thus a totally voluntary effort for both the teachers and students. The selection process, which is organized by Kedar Soni, is in two stages:
 Abhinav Philosopher - objective and subjective tasks online to primarily gauge students logical and verbal reasoning. Held around beginning of December by Abhinav Vidyalay. (school which coordinates the process) Top 20% are selected to the next stage.
 Indian Philosophy Olympiad - Essay round similar in format to the IPO competition. It is held online around January in a time-bound manner.
The two best from the stage 2 represent the country, provided they can fund themselves. Then the training program is held for a couple of weeks, to orient students to systematic philosophy and argumentation. It runs for about 12 hours a day and students need to be accommodated at the venue. Those clearing stage 1 are also invited in order to prepare them for next IPO.
After the program, until the IPO, students meet 2-3 times weekly for about 3–4 hours in an online lecture room (video + whiteboard) to discuss essay topics and their arguments.

Norway
In 2005, the first year of Norway participating in the IPO, Thor Steinar Grødal just picked his two best philosophy students at Foss high school, in 2006 he and Olav Birkeland picked one each as Foss High School and Oslo Handelsgymnasium were the only ones in Oslo and possibly in the whole of Norway that offered a philosophy course for high school students. Since 2007 a new subject 'history&philosophy' (5 lessons per week in 2nd and 3rd grade) has been introduced to many high schools in Norway, and the selection process for IPO has been tied up to the Baltic Sea Philosophy Essay Competition. 100 Norwegian students from 14 schools participated in this competition in November 2011. In 2012 there was for the first time a 2nd round in Oslo March 23–24 for the 10 best Norwegian participants. These ten went to IPO Oslo 2012 on the extended quota of the host country.

Switzerland
The selection process was initiated in 2005 by Jonas Pfister, and 2006 was the first year Switzerland participated in the IPO. The selection process is organized by the association SwissPhilO, the president of which is Lara Gafner, a former IPO participant for Switzerland. From 2005 to 2012, the selection process consisted of two stages, a first round and a second round. Since 2013 the selection process consists of three stages. At the first stage, students write an essay at school or at home. Out of these, the authors of the best essays are invited to a second round, a semi-final, where they participate in workshops and write a second essay in their mother tongue, that is German or French. Again, the authors of the best essays qualify for the next round, the national final, where the students again participate in workshops and write another essay. A jury of five members selects the two best who will represent the country at the IPO.

United States
The United States participated in IPO competitions four times until 2003. In 2001, the IPO was hosted by the US in Philadelphia. From 2003 until 2011, however, the US did not participate. At the 2009 December conference meeting of the American Philosophical Association (APA), Eastern Division teacher Joseph A. Murphy met with APA executive director, David Schrader, and told him about the curriculum for a course 'A History of Western Philosophy' taught in Spanish for American high school students in their last two years before university. Over the next year, the course was approved by the Curriculum Committee at Dwight-Englewood School (D-E). David Schrader and William McBride had been discussing ways to reanimate the US philosophy community to re-enter the IPO competitions. Adding Spanish as an official IPO language was seen to be a possible key to doing this. Spanish was added to English, French and German on a trial basis before IPO Vienna 2011. In order to participate in IPO Vienna 2011, Murphy chose two of his best philosophy students who also studied Spanish at D-E. Together they formed the 2011 US Delegation with the blessing of APA. Since then, there has been a national competition for high school students called the American Philosophy Olympiad, in which high school students from around the nation submit philosophy essays in either Spanish, French, or German in response to a given prompt. The two top essays are chosen, and those two students represent the United States at the IPO.

Overview of competitions
Each year, the IPO is held in a different city around the world. The table below gives an overview of each competition since the inaugural competition in 1993.

Overview of Awards

Notes

References

Further reading
 Jonas Pfister, "Les Olympiades de philosophie dans l'enseignement" (2009), Diotime. Revue internationale de didactique de la philosophie, 41 (07/2009). Online
 Juha Savolainen, Pekka Elo, Satu Honkala, Rebecca Cingi (Hrsg.) (2010), IPO Helsinki Finland 2009, Publications of The Finnish National Commission for UNESCO no 85, 2010.
 Moris Polanco (2015), Cómo escribir un ensayo de filosofía: Con especial referencia a la Olimpiada Internacional de Filosofía. Create Space. Independent Publishing Platform.
 Ivan Kolev (2016), International Philosophy Olympiad. In: Peters M. (eds) Encyclopedia of Educational Philosophy and Theory. Springer, Singapore, 1158–1164.
 Frank Murphy (2017), "International Philosophy Olympiad: A Writing Challenge for Young Philosophers. With an Appendix: How To Write a Philosophy Essay. A Guide for IPO Contestants", Journal of Didactics of Philosophy, Vol. 1, 2017, 49–66.

External links
 
 German Competition
 Austrian Competition
 Swiss Competition

Philosophy events
Writing contests
International Science Olympiad
Intellectual competitions
Recurring events established in 1993